This is a list of notable people who are from Markham, Ontario, Canada, or have spent a large part or formative part of their careers and/or lives in that city.

B
 Corie Beveridge, curler
 Joseph Blandisi, NHL player for the Pittsburgh Penguins
 Paula Brancati, actress
 Major John Button, Upper Canada settler, soldier
 Steve Byers, actor

C

 Paul Calandra, former Conservative MP and current Ontario PC Party MPP
 Emmanuelle Chriqui, actress
 Hayden Christensen (b. 1981), actor
 Matt Coates, Canadian football player
 Don Cousens (1938-2017), MPP, and Mayor of Markham
 Joseph Cramarossa, professional hockey player for Stockton Heat
 Bill Crothers, track and field athlete, Olympic silver medalist, 1964
 Ayesha Curry, actress and chef

D

 Andre De Grasse, track and field athlete
 Michael Del Zotto, NHL hockey player for the Belleville Senators

E
 William Eakin (1828–1918), Northwest Territories MLA and Speaker

F
 Warren Foegele (b. 1996), ice hockey forward
 Mariah Fujimagari (b. 1994), NWHL hockey player for the Buffalo Beauts

G
 Brendan Gaunce, NHL hockey player for the Vancouver Canucks
 Cameron Gaunce, NHL hockey player for the Columbus Blue Jackets
 Kim Gellard, curler
 Phylicia George, Canadian sprinter/hurdler
 Niko Giantsopoulos (b. 1994), soccer player
 Adam Gontier (b. 1978), former lead singer of Three Days Grace; current lead singer of Saint Asonia

H
 Ben Heppner, CC (b. 1956), Canadian dramatic tenor
 Karl Brooks Heisey, Canadian mining engineer and executive
 Jason Ho-shue, badminton player
 Cody Hodgson, former NHL player

J
 Ben Johnson, former Canadian sprinter

K
 Logan Kanapathi, MPP
 Brad Katsuyama, founder of Investors Exchange
 Aramis Kouzine (b. 1998), soccer player

L
 Stefan Lamanna (b. 1995), soccer player
 Mathieu Laurent (b. 1996), soccer player
 Michelle Li, badminton player, 3-time Olympian
 Jack Mingjie Lin (b. 1999), tennis player

M
 Mitch Marner, NHL hockey player for the Toronto Maple Leafs
 Mena Massoud, actor
 Brad May, retired NHL hockey player
 Benjamin Milliken II, Major York Militia, 1837 Upper Canada Rebellion
 Dominic Moore, retired NHL hockey player
 Norman Milliken, lumber mill and tavern owner
 Aviva Mongillo (b. 1998, Carys), actress and singer

O
 Anna-Marie Ondaatje (b. 2000), rhythmic gymnast

P
 Jennifer Pan, convicted of conspiring to kill her mother as well as attempting to kill her father
 Ken Pereira, field hockey player, Pan American Games medalist
 Justin Peroff, drummer for the band Broken Social Scene
 Jordanna Phillips (b. 1990), soccer player
 Connor Price, actor

R
 David Reesor, Canadian Senator and Reeve of Markham Village
 Peter Reesor, lumber mill owner, founder of Markham
 Christopher Richards, actor
 Albert John Robertson, Canadian politician; first Leader of the Opposition in the Legislative Assembly of Alberta, 1905–1909
 Lloyd Robertson, OC, news broadcaster
 Shauna Robertson, actress
 Jordan Romano (b. 1993), MLB pitcher for the Toronto Blue Jays
 Lucas Rumball (b. 1995), rugby union player
 Anna Russell, singer and opera parodist
 Trey Rutherford (b. 1995), football player

S
 Lilly Singh (also known as IISuperwomanII), talk show host
 Jeff Skinner, NHL hockey player for the Buffalo Sabres
 Steven Stamkos, NHL hockey player and Captain for the Tampa Bay Lightning
 Courtenay Stewart, Canadian synchronized swimmer
 Marlene Stewart Streit, OC, golfer
 Tammy Sutton-Brown, WNBA basketball player

T
 Brittney Tam (b. 1997), badminton player
 Steve Thomas, retired NHL hockey player
 Michelle Tong (b. 1997), badminton player
 Raffi Torres, retired NHL hockey player

U
 Luca Uccello, soccer player

V
 Iman Vellani (b. 2002), Ms. Marvel TV series

W
 Chris Wardman, founding member and guitarist of Blue Peter
 Justyn Warner, Canadian sprinter
 Stephen Weiss, NHL hockey player, currently a free agent
 Sarah Wells, track and field athlete
 Ethan Werek, professional ice hockey player, currently playing for the Belleville Senators
 Breanne Wilson-Bennett (b. 1996), NWHL ice hockey player

References

 
Markham
Markham